James Robinson (March 6, 1852October 16, 1932) was a Canadian politician.

Born in Derby, New Brunswick of parents who came from Scotland, Robinson was educated in Derby. A merchant and lumberman, he was a manager of the South-West Miramichi Boom & Lumber Company. He was also a director of the Newcastle Miramichi Spool Factory, Limited. He was a county councillor and warden of the country. He was a Conservative member of the Legislative Assembly of New Brunswick from January 1890 until January 1896 when he resigned to run for the House of Commons of Canada. He was elected in an 1896 by-election for the electoral district of Northumberland when the current MP, Michael Adams, was summoned to the Senate of Canada. A Conservative, he was re-elected in the 1896 and 1900 elections. He was defeated in the 1904 election.

In 1877, he married Grace Macdonald.

Electoral record

References

1852 births
1932 deaths
Conservative Party of Canada (1867–1942) MPs
Members of the House of Commons of Canada from New Brunswick
Progressive Conservative Party of New Brunswick MLAs
Canadian people of Scottish descent